Tomasz Winnicki can mean:

 Tomasz Winnicki (chemist), born 1934
 Tomasz Winnicki (political activist), born 1975